Digital eMation, Inc. is an animation studio located in Seoul, South Korea and founded in 1993. They specialize in traditional animation and digital animation.

Works
Alias
Bless the Harts
Johnny Test (Season 1 alongside Top Draw Animation)
King Star King (2023)
Team Galaxy
Seth MacFarlane's Cavalcade of Cartoon Comedy
The Venture Bros.
Time Squad (Season 1)
The Grim Adventures of Billy & Mandy (Seasons 3–6)
Billy & Mandy's Big Boogey Adventure
Dante's Inferno
Xiaolin Showdown (episodes: Like a Rock, Katnappe, Chameleon, Night of the Sapphire Dragon, Big as Texas, Mala Mala Jong, Citadel of Doom, Pandatown, The Sands of Time, Master Monk Guan, Screams of the Siren, The return of Pandabubba, The Demon Seed, The Apprentice, Dangerous Minds, Saving Omi, Finding Omi, The Life and times of Hannibal Roy Bean, Treasure of the Blind Swordsman, The Return of Master Monk Guan, Chucky Choo, Hannibal's Revenge, Time After Time part 2)
Evil Con Carne
Robotboy
Family Guy (season 6+)
Franklin and the Turtle Lake Treasure
Batman: The Brave and the Bold
Super Duper Sumos
The Cleveland Show
The LeBrons
Martin Mystery
Miraculous Chibi
Scooby-Doo series
Scooby-Doo! Abracadabra-Doo
Scooby-Doo! Camp Scare
Scooby-Doo! Legend of the Phantosaur
Scooby-Doo! Music of the Vampire
Big Top Scooby-Doo!
Scooby-Doo! Spooky Games
Scooby-Doo! Haunted Holidays
Scooby-Doo! Mask of the Blue Falcon
Shaggy & Scooby-Doo Get a Clue! (episodes: Shags to Riches, High Society Scooby, Smart House, Don't Feed the Animals, Mystery of the Missing Mystery Solvers, Pole to Pole, Operation Dog and Hippy Boy, Shaggy and Scooby World, Inside Job, The Many Faces Of Evil, There's a Doctor in the House, Runaway Robi, Scooby-Dudes, Uncle Albert Alert)
Scooby-Doo! Mystery Incorporated (second season)
Scooby-Doo! Stage Fright
Scooby-Doo! WrestleMania Mystery
Scooby-Doo! Frankencreepy
Scooby-Doo! Moon Monster Madness
Scooby-Doo! and Kiss: Rock and Roll Mystery
Be Cool, Scooby-Doo!
Scooby-Doo! and WWE: Curse of the Speed Demon
Scooby-Doo! Shaggy's Showdown
Scooby-Doo! & Batman: The Brave and the Bold
Scooby-Doo! and the Gourmet Ghost
Scooby-Doo! and the Curse of the 13th Ghost
Scooby-Doo! Return to Zombie Island
Scooby-Doo and Guess Who? (first season)
Happy Halloween, Scooby-Doo!
Scooby-Doo! The Sword and the Scoob
Straight Outta Nowhere: Scooby-Doo! Meets Courage the Cowardly Dog
Tom and Jerry series
Tom and Jerry: Back to Oz
Tom and Jerry: Willy Wonka and the Chocolate Factory
Stretch Armstrong and the Flex Fighters
Megas XLR (second season)
Gravity Falls (episodes: Headhunters, The Hand that Rocks the Mabel, Dipper vs. Manliness, Irrational Treasure, Fight Fighters, Summerween, Boss Mabel, Boyz Crazy, and Land Before Swine)
Totally Spies!
The Secret Saturdays
Over the Garden Wall
Dawn of the Croods
Young Justice: Outsiders
Animaniacs (2020) (Seasons 2 and 3 alongside Titmouse, Inc., Saerom Animation, Tiger Animation and Yowza! Animation)
Harriet the Spy
Samurai Jack (Season 5 alongside Rough Draft Korea)
Mortal Kombat Legends: Snow Blind

References

External links 
 

South Korean animation studios
Entertainment companies of South Korea
Mass media companies established in 1993
South Korean companies established in 1993